The Alpenfest is an annual celebration in Gaylord, Michigan. For over 50 years the Alpenfest has been a tradition for the townspeople and its visitors. It is held the third week of July.

The History of Alpenfest
In the early 1960s Gaylord, which is the county seat of Otsego County, was in the process of changing the town's image to that of the Alpine look. This change was hastened by the decision of U.S. Plywood to build a particle board plant in Gaylord. The process used to manufacture particle board was developed and patented by a Swiss businessman, Fred Fahrni. The new plant meant employment for many in the area and also opened the door for a big market in the county for aspen and pine, from which the “Novaply” was processed. Opening day for the festival set for July 5, 1965, and it was to run through July 10. Residents sewed their own dirndl's and men's alpine vests. The original event was called The Alpine Festival. It is now shortened to Alpenfest but is still celebrated as one of Gaylord's biggest events each summer.

There was no Alpenfest in 2020 due to the Covid-19 pandemic.

Events
The 54th Annual Alpenfest was held on July 10–14, 2018. Festivities  include arts and crafts on display and for sale, parades, concerts and stage shows, and tasty traditional foods. Kid's games, also amusement rides and family entertainment are also a part of the festival. The event that occurs after the official opening of Alpenfest is the Burning of the Boogg. It is a symbolical ceremony where wooden snowman of cotton wool is filled with the troubles and worries of the residents of the Alpine Village. The Boogg is then ignited and everyone's troubles go up in smoke and residents are free to celebrate Alpenfest. Other events include lampion making, a yodeling contest, swiss stone spitting contest, the walking parade, Die Groeste Kaffepause (World's Largest Coffee Break), ladies' ankle contest, men's knee contest and many more.

Queen's Pageant
Each year, young women between the ages of 16 - 22 compete for the title of Alpenfest Queen. The candidates are judged by mystery judges throughout the week of Alpenfest, as well as at the Queen's Pageant where they present an introduction, talent, evening gown and impromptu question. The selected Alpenfest Queen and her Court travel the state of Michigan throughout the following year of their reign and promote Alpenfest and Gaylord.

NOTE: no winner in 2020.

Burning of the Böögg history
In Zürich, Switzerland they create a snowman out of wood and fill the head with fireworks. In April they light the snowman on fire. People in Zurich say, "the faster the head explodes, the warmer or better summer will be." In Zurich, the burning of the Böögg is to be the transition from winter to spring. In Gaylord however, they inherited the tradition from Switzerland, but changed the meaning to better suit Gaylord. In Gaylord, their snowmen are made of cotton wool, and instead of it being the transition of seasons, people write their worries and problems down on a piece of paper and they place the paper inside the snowman. After that they light the snowman on fire and all worries and problems are supposed to disappear with the snowman.

Other attractions in Gaylord
Gaylord has many other attractions that should be interesting such as Elk Park. At Elk Park, visitors can watch the deer and elk in their natural habitat, and they could feed them.

References

Sources 
https://web.archive.org/web/20110723133225/http://www.gaylordmichigan.net/entertainment-57/
http://www.swissinfo.org/eng/front/detail/spring_explodes_into_life_zurich.html
http://www.swissworld.org/en/culture/seasonal_customs/spring_festival
https://web.archive.org/web/20090423123713/http://www.swisstownguide.ch/zh/info/eng/even103.html
Aplenfest traditions
http://www.static.record-eagle.com/2007/jul/17alpen.html
http://www.michigansights.com/michigancities/gaylord.html
http://www.mapquest.com
https://web.archive.org/web/20111006145014/http://www.gaylordmichigan.net/alpenfest--25/

External links
Gaylord Alpenfest
Gaylord Area Convention and Tourism Bureau
Alpine Village
Annual Festival Kicks off Today
Oregon's Alpenfest

Tourist attractions in Otsego County, Michigan
Festivals in Michigan